In mathematics, the Coxeter complex, named after H. S. M. Coxeter, is a geometrical structure (a simplicial complex) associated to a Coxeter group. Coxeter complexes are the basic objects that allow the construction of buildings; they form the apartments of a building.

Construction

The canonical linear representation

Let  be a Coxeter system with Coxeter matrix . The canonical representation is given by a vector space  with basis of formal symbols , which is equipped with the symmetric bilinear form . In particular, .

This representation has several foundational properties in the theory of Coxeter groups; for instance,  is positive definite if and only if  is finite.

Chambers and the Tits cone
This representation describes  as a reflection group, with the caveat that  might not be positive definite. It becomes important then to distinguish the representation  from its dual .

 

 

Then  is a reflection in the hyperplane . One has the fundamental chamber ; this has faces the so-called walls, .

Of major importance is the fact that  is convex.

The Coxeter complex
, where  is the multiplicative group of positive reals.

Examples

Finite dihedral groups
The dihedral groups  (of order 2n) are Coxeter groups, of corresponding type . These have the presentation .

For instance, in the case  we get the Coxeter group of type , acting on an equilateral triangle in the plane. Each reflection  has an associated hyperplane  in the dual vector space (which can be canonically identified with the vector space itself using the bilinear form , which is an inner product in this case as remarked above); these are the walls. They cut out chambers, as seen below:

The Coxeter complex is then the corresponding -gon, as in the image above. This is a simplicial complex of dimension 1, and it can be colored by cotype.

The infinite dihedral group
Another motivating example is the infinite dihedral group . This group has the Coxeter presentation .

This then gives the following picture:

In this case, the Tits cone is not the whole plane, but only the upper half plane. Taking the quotient by the positive reals then yields another copy of the real line, with marked points at the integers. This is the Coxeter complex of the infinite dihedral group.

Alternative construction of the Coxeter complex
Another description of the Coxeter complex uses standard cosets of the Coxeter group .

The Coxeter complex  is then the poset of standard cosets, ordered by reverse inclusion. This has a canonical structure of a simplicial complex, as do all posets that satisfy:
Any two elements have a greatest lower bound.

Properties
The Coxeter complex associated to  has dimension . It is homeomorphic to a -sphere if W is finite and is contractible if W is infinite.

See also
Buildings
Weyl group
Root system

References
 Peter Abramenko and Kenneth S. Brown, Buildings, Theory and Applications. Springer, 2008.

Group theory

Algebraic combinatorics
Geometric group theory
Mathematical structures